Raf Mauro is an American film, television and stage actor, and playwright. He starred as Freddy in the 1982 film They Call Me Bruce?

Mauro began his career in 1972, starring in the film Keep It Up, where he played the role of Paul. He has guest-starred in television programs including Seinfeld, Jake and the Fatman, Cheers, The Golden Girls, Caroline in the City, Knots Landing, Saved by the Bell, Charles in Charge, Family Matters and Full House. 

Between 1994 and 1997 Mauro wrote three books, titled When Kids Achieve: Positive Monologues for Preteen Boys and Girls, Fitting In: Monologues for Boys and Girls and Modern Monologues for Modern Kids. 

Mauro has written a play with David Stansfield about the aviator Bessie Coleman, titled A Good Day to Fly. He also has performed in theatre on a comedy improvisational, titled The Magic Mirror Players Children's Show.

Filmography

Film

Television

References

External links 

Rotten Tomatoes profile

Living people
Place of birth missing (living people)
Year of birth missing (living people)
American male television actors
American male film actors
American male stage actors
20th-century American male actors
21st-century American male actors
American dramatists and playwrights